Jessica Ann Giannino (born 1991) is a State representative for Revere in the Massachusetts House of Representatives. She was elected to the Massachusetts house in 2020. she served as Revere city councilor at large since 2012. She graduated from Revere High School. Her district of 16th Suffolk includes Chelsea: Ward 3: Precincts 2, 4, Ward 4: Precincts 2, 3; Revere: Ward 1: Precinct 3, Ward 3: Precinct 1, Ward 4, Ward 5: Precincts 1, 2, Ward 6; Saugus: Precincts 3, 10 (Essex Co.)
Gianinno won a two-way Democratic primary in 2020, the previous representative RoseLee Vincent was retiring.

Committees
Joint Committee on Economic Development and Emerging Technologies
Joint Committee on Election Laws
Joint Committee on Environment, Natural Resources and Agriculture

See also
 2021–2022 Massachusetts legislature

References 

Living people
Women state legislators in Massachusetts
Democratic Party members of the Massachusetts House of Representatives
21st-century American politicians
Revere High School (Massachusetts) alumni
1993 births
21st-century American women politicians